KCRM-LP (96.7 FM) is a radio station licensed to Marshalltown, Iowa.  The station is currently owned by Marshalltown Association For Catholic Education & Evangel.

References

External links

CRM-LP
Marshalltown, Iowa
CRM-LP